René Clair Award is an award instituted in 1994 and presented by the Académie française for achievements in the field of cinema. The prize was named after the French filmmaker René Clair. Each year, the winner of the prize is rewarded for the “whole of his cinematographic work”. Two special cases should however be noted, the awarding of two vermeil medals in 1995 to Pierre Billard on the one hand, and to Jean-Michel Frodon on the other, for critical works devoted to cinema.

Recipients
1994: Alexandre Astruc
1995: Robert Bresson
1995: Pierre Billard (awarded vermeil medal for his work: L'Âge classique du cinéma français. Du cinéma parlant à la Nouvelle vague)
1995: Jean-Michel Frodon (awarded vermeil medal for his work: L'Âge moderne du cinéma français. De la Nouvelle Vague à nos jours)
1996: Edouard Molinaro
1997: Jacques Rozier
1998: Costa-Gavras
1999: Roman Polanski
2000: Patrice Leconte
2001: Agnès Jaoui and Jean-Pierre Bacri
2002: Agnès Varda
2003: André Téchiné
2004: Alain Corneau
2005: Claude Chabrol
2009: Agnès Varda
2010: Xavier Giannoli
2011: Danièle Thompson
2012: Benoît Jacquot
2013: Philippe Le Guay
2014: Robert Guédiguian
2015: Jacques Perrin
2016: Anne Fontaine
2017: Stéphane Brizé
2018: Bruno Dumont

References 

French film awards
Awards established in 1994
1994 establishments in France